The 1955 Scottish League Cup final was played on 22 October 1955, at Hampden Park in Glasgow and was the final of the 10th Scottish League Cup competition. The final was contested by Aberdeen and St Mirren. Aberdeen won the match 2–1, thanks to a goal by Graham Leggat and an own goal by Jim Mallan. The winning goal, scored 11 minutes from the end, was a wind-assisted cross. The match proved to be St Mirren's last appearance in a Scottish League Cup final until 2010.

Match details

References

External links 
 Soccerbase

1955
League Cup Final
Scottish League Cup Final 1955
Scottish League Cup Final 1955
1950s in Glasgow
October 1955 sports events in the United Kingdom